The 2022 North Carolina Tar Heels football team represented the University of North Carolina at Chapel Hill as a member of the Coastal Division of the Atlantic Coast Conference (ACC) for the 2022 NCAA Division I FBS football season. The Tar Heels were led by head coach Mack Brown, who was in the fourth season of his second stint at North Carolina and 14th overall season at the university. The team played their home games at Kenan Memorial Stadium.

Previous season
The 2021 campaign did not live up to preseason expectations for the Tar Heels. Hyped as one of the premier programs in the ACC and ranked in the AP top ten to begin the season, the team sputtered out of the gate, dropping the season opener to Virginia Tech on the road in Blacksburg. Poor offensive line and receiver play, with the exception of Josh Downs, made the Tar Heels have to rely even more on star quarterback Sam Howell's running ability. Defensive struggles plagued the Tar Heels as well, as coordinator Jay Bateman's system proved too complicated and unreliable. The Tar Heels were able to reach bowl eligibility, however, and faced South Carolina in the Duke's Mayo Bowl, where they were soundly beaten to end 2021. Individually, Downs and Howell set numerous school records for the quarterback and wide receiver positions, and the emergence of players like DL Myles Murphy and WR Antoine Green provided bright spots to an otherwise bleak season.

Offseason

Coaching changes
Immediately following the bowl-game loss to South Carolina, head coach Mack Brown stated that changes needed to be made. Speculation then began as to what those changes would be, with suggestions including the possibility of certain coaches being let go. The changes began to crystalize when, on January 7, 2022, co-defensive coordinator/safeties coach Jay Bateman and special teams coordinator/outside linebackers coach Jovan Dewitt were let go.

The following day, the school announced the hires of Gene Chizik and Charlton Warren to fill the vacant positions on social media. Chizik was named Assistant Head Coach for Defense, and Warren co-defensive coordinator/defensive backs coach. Both Chizik and Warren were on staff in Chapel Hill under former head coach Larry Fedora during the 2015 and 2016 seasons, and were instrumental in turning around a defense that had struggled mightily in the 2014 season, leading to a combined 19 wins during their first stints in Chapel Hill.

Running backs coach Larry Porter, who served as Assistant STC in 2021, was elevated to Special Teams Coordinator following Dewitt's departure, while continuing his responsibilities with the running back position.

On February 28, 2022, a day before the beginning of the Tar Heels' spring practice, offensive line coach Stacy Searels left the team to take the same position with Georgia.

The next day, as spring practice kicked off, it was reported by  The Athletic's Bruce Feldman and other sources that the Tar Heels were targeting Louisville OL coach Jack Bicknell Jr. for the vacant position, though nothing official was announced by either school. Carolina officially announced Bicknell's hiring on March 3, 2022. Bicknell and offensive coordinator Phil Longo had previously worked together when they were at Ole Miss.

Tar Heel football alumnus and NFL safety Da'Norris Searcy returned to the program in the spring, joining the staff as the Director of Football Student Athlete Development.

Departures

NFL Draft

The following Tar Heels were selected in the 2022 NFL Draft. The Tar Heels' four 2022 selections tied for the most draft picks in the ACC.

Undrafted free agent signings
The following players went unselected in the 2022 NFL Draft, and signed UDFA rookie contracts with NFL teams.

 Tomon Fox (LB) – New York Giants
 Jeremiah Gemmel (LB) – San Francisco 49ers
 Kyler McMichael (DB) – Tampa Bay Buccaneers
 Jordan Tucker (OL) – Pittsburgh Steelers
 Garrett Walston (TE) – San Francisco 49ers

Preseason transfers
Fifteen members of the 2021 team elected to enter the NCAA transfer portal prior to the 2022 season. 

† Elected to use extra year of eligibility granted by the NCAA in response to COVID-19. 
‡ Walk-on

Other Preseason departures
Three players left the team for personal reasons.

Additions

Incoming transfers

Recruiting class

North Carolina signed 17 players in the class of 2022. The Tar Heels' class finished 10th in both the 247Sports and Rivals rankings. Nine signees were ranked in the final ESPN 300 top prospect list.

Preseason

ACC Media Poll
2022 ACC Football Media Days were held at The Westin Charlotte on July 20 and 21, 2022. At that event, head coaches and player representatives from the 14 ACC teams met with the media and discussed the upcoming season. Following the event, the ACC released a preseason poll on July 26, 2022 which was voted on by members of the sports media.

Preseason All-ACC Team
North Carolina had one player selected by the media make the 2022 Preseason All-ACC Team.

Josh Downs – WR/Specialist

Preseason All-Americans

Josh Downs (Sporting News) – 2nd Team (WR)

Award watch lists

Personnel

Coaching staff

Roster

Depth chart
Holiday Bowl Depth Chart

True Freshman

Schedule

Game summaries

Florida A&M

at Appalachian State

at Georgia State
North Carolina was the first Power Five team to play a road game at Georgia State.

Notre Dame

Virginia Tech

at Miami (FL)

at Duke

Pittsburgh

at Virginia

at Wake Forest

Georgia Tech

NC State

vs. No. 9 Clemson (ACC Championship Game)

vs. No. 15 Oregon (Holiday Bowl)

Rankings

After the season

All-ACC Selections

1st Team
Drake Maye (QB)
Josh Downs (WR)
Cedric Gray (LB)

2nd Team
Josh Downs (AP)
Storm Duck (DB)

3rd Team
Antoine Green (WR)
Asim Richards (OL)
Ben Kiernan (P)

Honorable Mention
Bryson Nesbit (TE)
Corey Gaynor (OL)
Power Echols (LB)

All-Americans
Josh Downs (FWAA Second-Team)
Cedric Gray (Sporting News Second-Team)

Individual Awards
Drake Maye 
ACC Player of the Year
ACC Offensive Player of the Year 
ACC Rookie of the Year
ACC Offensive Rookie of the Year
AP ACC Offensive Player of the Year
Shaun Alexander Freshman of the Year

Tylee Craft
Disney Spirit Award

Coaching Changes
Following the ACC Championship Game multiple outlets reported on December 7, 2022 that offensive coordinator/quarterbacks coach Phil Longo was accepting the same job at Wisconsin. Offensive line coach Jack Bicknell Jr. was reported to follow Longo to Madison.

On December 14, 2022, the Tar Heels made their first move to fill the vacancies, hiring Randy Clements as their new offensive line coach. They later hired Chip Lindsey to fill the offensive coordinator/quarterbacks coach vacancy.

Departures

Transfer Portal Entries
In August 2022, the NCAA issued updated guidance for players seeking to transfer. One update to the policy was the institution of transfer windows, with entry periods designated by when specific seasons end (previously players could enter at their discretion any time before the portal closed). In accordance with the new guidance, the 45-day postseason transfer period for football opened on December 5, 2022, and will close in January 2023. A second transfer window will open in May 2023, following the conclusion of spring practices. 

The following members of the 2022 Tar Heel team entered the NCAA transfer portal during the postseason transfer period. The player's class is reflective of internal listing on the UNC roster.

NFL Draft Entries
The following players declared for the 2023 NFL Draft. Some chose to opt out of the Holiday Bowl.

Notes
 Longo left for the same position at Wisconsin prior to the Holiday Bowl. AHC/WR coach Lonnie Galloway served as interim OC and called plays in the gam.
 Warren and Thigpen have the title of co-defensive coordinator, but serve under Chizik, whose official title is Assistant Head Coach for Defense.

References

North Carolina
North Carolina Tar Heels football seasons
North Carolina Tar Heels football